Mikhaylovsky District is the name of several administrative and municipal districts in Russia. The name is generally derived from or is related to the male first name Mikhail.

Districts of the federal subjects
Mikhaylovsky District, Altai Krai, an administrative and municipal district of Altai Krai
Mikhaylovsky District, Amur Oblast, an administrative and municipal district of Amur Oblast
Mikhaylovsky District, Primorsky Krai, an administrative and municipal district of Primorsky Krai
Mikhaylovsky District, Ryazan Oblast, an administrative and municipal district of Ryazan Oblast
Mikhaylovsky District, Volgograd Oblast, an administrative district of Volgograd Oblast

Renamed districts
Mikhaylovsky District, name of Lesnoy District of Moscow Oblast (currently in Tver Oblast) between 1929 and 1930.

See also
Mikhaylovsky (disambiguation)
Mikhaylovsk
Mikhaylov (disambiguation)

References